Deborah J. Ross (also known as, Deborah Wheeler; born April 1947), is an American science fiction and fantasy author.

Biography 
Deborah Jean Ross was born in April 1947 and grew up in California. She attended Portland State University, graduating in 1973.

Around this time, she became friends with Marion Zimmer Bradley.  When Bradley was asked to edit the first Sword and Sorceress, Ross submitted a short story for the anthology, "Imperatrix" (1984).  "Imperatrix" became her first published short story, under her married name of Deborah Wheeler. She continued to write for years, producing a number of short stories and two novels, Jaydium and Northlight, through DAW books.

Before Bradley's death in 1999, Ross was invited to work on a project with her set in Darkover.

Eventually, Ross returned to her maiden name, Deborah J. Ross.

Bibliography

Novels as Deborah Wheeler
 Jaydium (1993), DAW Books,  (out of print)
 Northlight (1995), DAW Books,  (out of print)
 Collaborators (2013), Dragon Moon Press,

Darkover
Ross worked with Marion Zimmer Bradley on several books in the Darkover series.

The Clingfire Trilogy:
 The Fall of Neskaya (2001), DAW Books, hardback:  paperback: 
 Zandru's Forge (2003), DAW Books, hardback:  paperback: 
 A Flame in Hali (2004), DAW Books, hardback:  paperback: 
The Modern Darkover series, which is a continuation of Zimmer Bradley's novel Traitor's Sun.
 The Alton Gift (2007), DAW Books, hardback:  paperback: 
 The Children of Kings (2013), hardback: 
 The Laran Gambit (2022), hardback: 
Hastur Lord (2010), DAW Books, hardback: 
 Thunderlord! (2016)

The Seven-Petaled Shield
An original fantasy series, intended to be a trilogy
 The Seven-Petaled Shield (2013), DAW Books, 
 Shannivar: Volume Two of The Seven-Petaled Shield (2013), DAW Books, 
 The Heir of Khored: Book Three of The Seven-Petaled Shield (2014), DAW Books,

Darkover anthologies
The publication of the anthologies of Darkover restarted in 2013.
 Music of Darkover (with Elisabeth Waters) (2013)
 Stars of Darkover (2014)
 Gifts of Darkover (2015)
 Realms of Darkover (2016)
 Masques of Darkover (2017)
 Crossroads of Darkover (2018)
 Citadels of Darkover (2019)

A collection of Ross stories.
 A Heat Wave in the Hellers: and Other Tales of Darkover (2019)

Anthologies
 Lace and Blade (2008), Norilana Books.
 Lace and Blade 2 (2009), Norilana Books.
 Lace and Blade 4 (2018)
 Lace and Blade 5 (2019)

References

External links
 Deborah J. Ross's personal website
 Bradley's Literary Works Trust
 DAW Books

20th-century American novelists
21st-century American novelists
American science fiction writers
American women short story writers
American women novelists
1947 births
Living people
Women science fiction and fantasy writers
20th-century American women writers
21st-century American women writers
20th-century American short story writers
21st-century American short story writers